Galagi Hulkoppa is a village in Dharwad district of Karnataka, India.

Demographics 
As of the 2011 Census of India there were 932 households in Galagi and a total population of 4,736 consisting of 2,414 males and 2,322 females. There were 744 children ages 0-6.

References

Villages in Dharwad district